This is a list of contestants who have appeared on the television series, HaMerotz LaMillion. Contestants with a pre-existing relationship form a team and race around the world against other teams to win ₪1,000,000. In total, 180 contestants have appeared in the series comprising 90 teams of 2.

Contestants
The presented information was accurate at the time of filming.

Gallery

See also

HaMerotz LaMillion contestants
HaMerotz LaMillion
Lists of Israeli people